Terror of the Plains is a 1934 American Western film directed by Harry S. Webb and starring Tom Tyler, Roberta Gale and William Gould.

Main cast
 Tom Tyler as Tom Lansing - Posing as Tom Smith  
 Roberta Gale as Bess Roberts  
 William Gould as  Kirk Cramer - aka Butcher Wells 
 Slim Whitaker as Nevada - Henchman 
 Fern Emmett as Rose  
 Nelson McDowell as Parson Jones  
 Frank Rice as Banty - Tom's Sidekick  
 Ralph Lewis as Dad Lansing  
 Robert Walker as Sheriff  
 Murdock MacQuarrie as  Cole - Foreman

References

Bibliography
 Pitts, Michael R. Poverty Row Studios, 1929–1940: An Illustrated History of 55 Independent Film Companies, with a Filmography for Each. McFarland & Company, 2005.

External links
 

1934 films
1934 Western (genre) films
1930s English-language films
American Western (genre) films
Films directed by Harry S. Webb
Reliable Pictures films
American black-and-white films
1930s American films